Lutz Tilo Ferdinand Kayser (*  in Stuttgart, Germany, †   was a German aerospace engineer, who founded the world's first commercial space launch company, OTRAG.

Lutz Kayser, is the uncle of German serial entrepreneur Lin Kayser, who sits on the advisory board of the Munich space launcher company Isar Aerospace. His father, the chemist Ludwig Kayser, was the director of the German sugar-producing corporation Suedzucker AG. His brother Manfred Kayser, was managing director of the Dornier factory in Lindau, Germany.

References

1939 births
2017 deaths
German aerospace engineers
German company founders
People from Stuttgart